Chernor Ramadan Maju Bah (born April 29, 1972) also commonly known by his nickname Chericoco  is Sierra Leonean lawyer and politician who is currently the leader of opposition since 2019 and previous held the position of  Deputy speaker of parliament of Sierra Leone in the erstwhile government of Hon. Ernest Bai Korma and Parliamentary Chairman of the Mines and Minerals Resources Committee. He had also served as Chairman of the Parliamentarry Legislative Committee.

He is a member of the Sierra Leone Parliament from the Western Area Urban District, representing  constituency 110, which is mainly made up of the neighborhood of Brookfields in Freetown. He is the ruling All People's Congress (APC) vice presidential candidate for the 2018 Sierra Leone presidential election, having named the APC vice presidential candidate at the party's convention in Makeni on October 15, 2017.

Chernor Maju Bah was first elected a member of parliament in the 2007 Sierra Leone Parliamentary elections. He was re-elected in the 2012 Sierra Leone Parliamentary elections with 68.45%, defeating his main opponent Joseph Maada Soyei of the main opposition Sierra Leone People's Party (SLPP).

Chernor Maju Bah was born and raised in the neighborhood of Brookfield in the capital Freetown. He is a  practicing Muslim and a member of the Fula ethnic group from Freetown.  He is a barrister-solicitor by profession.

References

21st-century Sierra Leonean politicians
Fourah Bay College alumni
All People's Congress politicians
Sierra Leonean Muslims
Sierra Leonean Fula people
People from Freetown
1972 births
Living people